Luluabourg or Lualuaburg was a Belgian colonial place name, derived from the Luluwa river, which may refer to:
 Luluabourg (city) - now known as Kananga
 Luluabourg Province